The Sochi Symphony Orchestra is an orchestra based in Sochi, Russia.

History
The orchestra was founded in 1991 as a chamber ensemble, in 2001 it received the status of a symphony orchestra. Its current chief conductor is Oleg Soldatov. 
The orchestra regularly gives concerts in Sochi and other Russian towns. It performed with internationally known soloists, such as Denis Matsuev and Johanna Beisteiner.

References

External links
 History of the Sochi Symphony Orchestra on the website of the Department for Culture of Sochi City Administration. (Russian).

Musical groups established in 1991
Russian symphony orchestras
1991 establishments in Russia